In computing, Oracle Application Development Framework, usually called Oracle ADF, provides a Java framework for building enterprise applications. It provides visual and declarative approaches to Java EE development. It supports rapid application development based on ready-to-use design patterns, metadata-driven and visual tools.

Supported technologies 
Based on the MVC architecture. Oracle ADF can support any combination of the following:

Model 
 Web Services - both SOAP and REST
 TopLink - and EclipseLink
 JavaBeans
 POJO - simple Java classes (Plain Old Java Objects)
 ADF Business components(entity object, view object)
 Portlets
 CSV and XML files
 SQL Queries

Controller 
 JavaServer Faces (JSF)
 ADF Task Flows - extension of the JSF controller layer that adds complete process flow and reusability aspects.
 Struts
 Jspx (JavaServer Pages, XML compliant variation of the JSP standard)

View 
 Swing
 JavaServer Pages (JSP)
 JavaServer Faces (JSF)
 ADF Faces - an Oracle implementation of JavaServer Faces
 Facelets
 ADF Mobile browser - based on Apache Trinidad
 Excel through ADF desktop integration

The Oracle JDeveloper free Integrated Development Environment provides a graphical interface for creating data-management applications using ADF.

Oracle also offers Eclipse based tooling for ADF in Oracle Enterprise Pack For Eclipse.

Implementers can deploy Oracle ADF applications on Java EE-compliant containers. Oracle WebLogic and IBM WebSphere are officially supported. Users of the free ADF Essentials edition can buy support for these applications on GlassFish.

History 
Oracle Corporation has marketed parts of Oracle ADF since 1999 — specifically ADF Business Components — then known as "JBO" and later as "BC4J" ("Business Components for Java").

The  ADF architecture with the generic model/binding layer was introduced with JDeveloper 9.0.5.

In June 2006 Oracle Corporation donated the ADF Faces component library to Apache Trinidad. (ADF Faces, Oracle's JSF implementation, includes over 100 components.)
In September 2012 Oracle introduced a free version of the core Oracle ADF technologies under the name "Oracle ADF Essentials". For more information, see
http://www.oracle.com/technetwork/developer-tools/adf/overview/components-1844931.html.

Licensing 
Oracle ADF Essentials is a free to develop and deploy packaging of the key core technologies of Oracle ADF.
See the license terms for Oracle ADF Essentials: http://www.oracle.com/technetwork/licenses/adf-essentials-license-1837221.html
For the "full" Oracle ADF:
The Oracle Application Server licence includes a component for a license fee for Oracle ADF. This means that all users who have purchased an Oracle Application Server licence may use Oracle ADF for free. Users who want to deploy ADF to a third-party application-server can purchase an ADF runtime license at their local Oracle sales office. Users can develop and test Oracle ADF applications free of charge exclusively within Oracle JDeveloper.

Oracle Corporation purchased WebLogic in June 2008, and thus no longer regards it as a third-party application-server, so ADF is included in every WebLogic license.

Supported customers can get access to the source code for Oracle ADF through a request to Oracle Support.

See also 

 JDeveloper
 Eclipse
 Oracle Enterprise Pack for Eclipse
 Oracle WebLogic Server
 Oracle Fusion
 JSF
 JBoss Seam
 Spring framework
 Struts
 Vaadin

References

External links 
 
Oracle ADF Essentials
Oracle JDeveloper site
Basic Demo
Tutorial
JSR-227 (withdrawn)
JDeveloper 10.1.3 Tag Library Information

Oracle software
Java development tools
Software frameworks